The Industrial Worker, 1840–1860: The Reaction of American Industrial Society to the Advance of the Industrial Revolution is a book published in 1924 by Canadian-born historian Norman Ware.

The book suggests that the traditional historical underemphasis of class consciousness and radicalism was the natural reaction of workers to the perceived dehumanization of capitalist society, following the rise of industrialism in mid-19th century America. Many of these observations and conclusions are drawn from workers' writings in the popular labor newspapers of the time, including Voice of Industry, Working Man's Advocate, and The Awl.

The book was republished in 1990 by Ivan R. Dee, Inc., with an introduction by Thomas Dublin.

References
Ware, Norman (1924). The Industrial Worker, 1840-1860: The Reaction of American Industrial Society to the Advance of the Industrial Revolution Boston: Houghton Mifflin.

External links
 The full text of The Industrial Worker at HathiTrust Digital Library

History books about the United States
1924 non-fiction books
Labor history of the United States
Books about labor history
1924 in economics